The FIS Snowboarding World Championships 2005 took place between January 16 and January 22 in Whistler-Blackcomb, near Vancouver, British Columbia, Canada. The venues would be part of the 2010 Winter Olympics at Cypress Mountain.

Results

Men's results

Snowboard Cross
The Snowboard Cross finals took place on January 18.

Parallel Giant Slalom
Parallel Giant Slalom finals took place on January 20.

Parallel Slalom
The Parallel Slalom finals took place on January 19.

Halfpipe
The finals took place on January 22.

Big Air
Big Air finals took place on January 21.

Women's Events

Snowboard Cross
The Snowboard Cross finals took place on January 18.

Parallel Giant Slalom
Parallel Giant Slalom finals took place on January 20.

Parallel Slalom
The Parallel Slalom finals took place on January 19.

Halfpipe
The finals took place on January 22.

Medal table

References

External links
 

2005
2005 in Canadian sports
2005 in snowboarding
2005 in British Columbia
January 2005 sports events in Canada